Great Day in the Morning is a Technicolor Superscope 1956 film. It was directed by Jacques Tourneur and stars Virginia Mayo, Robert Stack, and Ruth Roman in a story set in 1860s Denver.

Plot
In the year 1861, just prior to the outbreak of the Civil War in the Colorado Territory, Owen Pentecost (Robert Stack) is a man from North Carolina who comes west to Denver on a whim. He encounters Ann Merry Alaine (Virginia Mayo), who is going there to open a dress shop.

In a Denver hotel saloon, Owen wins a poker game with the owner, Jumbo Means (Raymond Burr),
who bet his estate on the last hand. Along with the hotel comes Boston Grant (Ruth Roman), who works there.

Both women begin to fall for Owen. He has money on his mind, specifically the gold of the town's Confederates, which turns out to be what brought him here. But the predominantly Union town wants the gold, and with the Civil War approaching, the town is split. Owen leads the Southerners in an escape attempt with the gold.

Cast
 Robert Stack as Owen
 Virginia Mayo as Ann Merry
 Ruth Roman as Boston
 Raymond Burr as Jumbo
 Alex Nicol as Capt. Kirby
 Regis Toomey as Father Murphy
 Leo Gordon as Zeff Masterson
 Carlton Young as Col. Gibson
 Donald MacDonald as Gary John Lawford
 Peter Whitney as Phil the Cannibal
 Dan White as Rogers (uncredited)

See also
 List of American films of 1956
 "Great day in the morning" is a southern expression, e.g., James Brown used it in Get On Up (2014)
 "Great Day in the Morning", a song recorded by such artists as:
 Hoots & Hellmouth, on the album Salt (2012)
 The Hoppers, a gospel song on the album Great Day (2003)
 Brad Vickers & His Vestapolitans
 "Greatdayndamornin'/Booty" (2012), a song by D'Angelo

References

External links
 
 
 
 

1956 films
Films directed by Jacques Tourneur
Films set in 1861
Films set in Colorado
1956 Western (genre) films
Films about gambling
American Western (genre) films
1950s English-language films
Films based on American novels
American Civil War films
Films with screenplays by Lesser Samuels
Films scored by Leith Stevens
1950s historical films
American historical films
1950s American films